Umberto Ongania (Venice 1867–1942) was an Italian painter, mainly of vedute of his native city.

Biography
He painted both watercolors and oils. He exhibited in 1887 at Venice, La Porta della Carta,  and in 1888 at Bologna, Il Palazzo Ducale di Venezia. He continued to paint until the first decades of the twentieth century.

He was one of the many illustrators who collaborated in the illustration of a book on the Basilica of San Marco, with text by Camillo Boito He is the first son if the book's editor Ferdinando Ongania.

He married Elena Belozerskij, the daughter of Ivan Ivanovic Belozerskij.

References

19th-century Italian painters
Italian male painters
Painters from Venice
Italian vedutisti
1867 births
1942 deaths
20th-century Italian painters
19th-century Italian male artists
20th-century Italian male artists